Kingsford Country Park, officially Kingsford Forest Park, was in Worcestershire, England, U.K. and managed by Worcestershire County Council. It adjoined Kinver Edge, Staffordshire, a National Trust property, to which it was connected by multiple paths. Part of the country park was formerly known as Blakeshall Common.

The woodland stretches over a terrain of hills and cliffs, with many sandy paths crisscrossing the lower woodland—some even going up cliff outcrops and across to a middle section between the woodland floor and clifftops—and the main paths leading up to the cliffs, which are also dominated by woodland. 

There are four circular trails starting from Kingsford Lane and Blakeshall Lane car parks:  
The Robin Trail, a third of a mile (0.5 km)
The Coal Tit Trail, over one mile (2 km)
The Nuthatch Trail, about one and a half miles (2.5 km)
The Woodpecker Trail, almost two miles (3 km)

Transfer to the National Trust
In 2014 the Worcestershire Council Cabinet approved a report proposing the transfer of the freehold of Kingsford Forest Park to the National Trust. In November 2014 the Council's Overview and Scrutiny Performance Board accepted the report, noting that it could be implemented immediately without being considered again by Cabinet or the full Council, and that the Council did not have a duty to consult with the public on such transfers or the potential introduction of car park charges by another organisation. In September 2015 it was reported that the deal was still to be finalised. , 'Kingsford Forest Park' signs at the entrances in Kingsford Lane and Blakeshall Lane have been removed and replaced by 'National Trust Kinver Edge' signs.

In April 2019 the National Trust announced plans to fence off large parts of the Country Park and to cut down trees on Blakeshall Common in order to turn it into a traditional lowland heath.

References/External Links

 Enjoy England- Kingsford Forest Park.
 The AA - Kingsford Country Park and villages
 Kinver Edge
 Kingsford Forest Park

Country parks in Worcestershire